A shot trap is a deficiency in an armoured vehicle's design. It is a location where a shell that has struck but fails to penetrate may ricochet in such a manner as to hit another area of the vehicle where it is more likely to cause damage.

For example, the initial turret design of the Panther, Tiger II, M26 Pershing and KV-1 tanks had shot traps. The lower edge of the curved mantlet acted as a shot trap by deflecting incoming shots downwards towards the hull roof or into the turret ring where the shell could potentially jam the traverse mechanism. In an attempt to minimize the shot trap potential, some late production Panther G and the M26 Pershing T26E5 prototype modified the lower edge of the mantlet. The final Tiger II production turret did not feature the curved front of the early turret, instead using a flat plate sloped back 10 degrees.

Notes

References

Vehicle armour